Robert Downey Jr. is an American actor and film producer who has starred in numerous films, and television series. Downey made his acting debut in his father's film Pound at the age of five. In the 1980s, Downey was considered a member of the Brat Pack after appearing in the films Weird Science with Anthony Michael Hall (1985), Less than Zero with Andrew McCarthy (1987), and Johnny Be Good again with Hall (1988). Downey also starred in the films True Believer (1989) and Chances Are (1989), and was a regular cast member on the late-night variety show Saturday Night Live in 1985.

In the 1990s, Downey was featured in the films Air America with Mel Gibson (1990), Soapdish with Sally Field (1991), Chaplin as Charlie Chaplin (1992), Heart and Souls with Alfre Woodard and Kyra Sedgwick (1993), Short Cuts with Julianne Moore (1993), Only You with Marisa Tomei (1994), Richard III with Ian McKellen (1995), and U.S. Marshals with Tommy Lee Jones (1998). His role in Chaplin earned him an Academy Award nomination for Best Actor and a BAFTA Award win for Best Actor in a Leading Role.

Downey had a regular role in the television series Ally McBeal in 2000, which won him a Golden Globe for Best Supporting Actor. He was then cast in the 2003 films The Singing Detective alongside Robin Wright and Gothika with Halle Berry. In 2005, he starred in Kiss Kiss Bang Bang with Val Kilmer; in Good Night, and Good Luck with David Strathairn and George Clooney; and voiced the character of Patrick Pewterschmidt in the animated series Family Guy. The following year, he appeared in the animated science fiction film A Scanner Darkly and as Paul Avery in the 2007 film Zodiac.

Downey was cast as the role of Tony Stark / Iron Man in the 2008 Marvel Studios film Iron Man, a role he later reprised in Iron Man 2 (2010), The Avengers (2012), Iron Man 3, Avengers: Age of Ultron (2015), Captain America: Civil War (2016), Spider-Man: Homecoming (2017), Avengers: Infinity War (2018), and Avengers: Endgame (2019).  He also starred in the films Tropic Thunder (2008) and The Soloist (2009), and played the title character in Sherlock Holmes (2009) and Sherlock Holmes: A Game of Shadows (2011). In 2020, he starred as the title character in Dolittle. For his role in Tropic Thunder, he was nominated for an Academy Award and a BAFTA for Best Supporting Actor. He also won a Golden Globe Award for Best Actor for his role in Sherlock Holmes.

Film

Television

Video game

Music video

References

External links
 
 Robert Downey Jr. at the Rotten Tomatoes

Male actor filmographies
American filmographies